No Now (stylized as both NO NOW and No NOW) is the debut studio album by English musician Clarence Clarity. It was released on 2 March 2015 on the Bella Union label.

Background 
Clarity had gained notability among the music community for his previous releases, 2013's Save †hyself EP and 2014's Who Am Eye EP, both of which featured tracks that reappeared on No Now.

No Now was Clarity's first full-length album under the Clarence Clarity name. In an interview with DIY Magazine he stated that "I just wanted to make it the biggest, boldest statement that I could possibly make." He claimed that the LP took years to create and that his previous EPs were "bitesize [sic] clarity".

Clarity expressed in the press release for the album that the album was his "bubble of clarity", and that it was "the exorcism of everything I’ve ever learned. It’s all left me now – no more human condition left to give. This is the album I’ve had to make. And now I can bow out ungracefully – Creator and destroyer of my own worlds."

Reception 
The Guardian gave the album praise, saying it sounded "like funk played by a swarm of bees" and that it was "almost as good as Clarence Clarity thinks it is," also drawing comparison to much of Prince's output. Consequence of Sound drew a similar comparison, stating "We've seen shades of his messianic act before. Prince is one touchstone, both for his larger-than-life persona and his willingness", calling No Now a "rollercoaster of an album". DIY gave it 4 stars, claiming Clarence is "currently without an equal" and describing his music as polarizing.

Track listing

Notes

References 

2015 albums
Clarence Clarity albums
Experimental pop albums